Spondylometaphyseal dysplasia, East-African type is a rare genetic disorder which is characterized by skeletal abnormalities involving the vertebrae and the metaphysis. Only two isolated cases have been reported.

Description 

People with this disorder usually have the following symptoms:

 Severe early-onset metaphyseal dysplasia which makes the metaphyses have the shape of a bracket
 Pelvis dysplasia
 Oval-shaped vertebrae

Etiology 

This disorder was first discovered in 2002, by Verloes et al, when they described two un-related patients from East Africa, both of them had additional features such as short-limbed short stature, brachydactyly, etc. to be more specific, one child came from healthy un-related Rwandanese parents and the other child came from healthy un-related parents from Madagascar. They concluded that the patients did not have SMD type A4, but rather a brand new type of SMD.

References 

Genetic diseases and disorders